This article concerns the period 719 BC – 710 BC.

Events
719 BC — Zhou Huan Wang of the Zhou Dynasty becomes ruler of China.
718 BC — Gyges becomes the ruler of Lydia.
717 BC — Assyrian king Sargon conquers the Neo-Hittite state of Carchemish.
717 BC — Sargon II founds a new capital for Assyria at Dur-Sharrukin.
717 BC – 716 BC — Sargon II leads his armies in a sweeping attack along the Philistine coast, where he defeats the pharaoh.
717 BC — Roman legend marks this as the date that Romulus ended his rule. Interregnum starts.
716 BC — Pythagoras of Laconia wins the stadion race at the 16th Olympic Games.
715 BC — Interregnum ends. Start of the reign of  the second King of Rome — Numa Pompilius.
 715 BC — Conquest of Messenia by Sparta ends.
713 BC — Numa Pompilius, King of Rome, reforms the Roman calendar, introducing January and February and adding 5 days to the calendar.
713 BC — Olmecs establish Monte Albán, the sacred city, and continue building pyramids.
712 BC — Numa Pompilius creates the office of Pontifex Maximus.
712 BC — Polus of Epidaurus wins the stadion race at the 17th Olympic Games.
c. 710 BC — The Medes are united.

Date unknown 

 Judah, Tyre and Sidon revolt against Assyria.

Significant people
 716 BC—Piye dies.
 715 BC—Osorkon IV dies, ending the Twenty-second dynasty of Egypt.
 713 BC—Birth of semi-legendary Zalmoxis in Dacia.
 February 13 711 BC (according to legend)—Birth of semi-legendary Emperor Jimmu, the first Emperor of Japan.

References